This is a recap of the 1987 season for the Professional Bowlers Association (PBA) Tour.  It was the tour's 29th season, and consisted of 33 events.

Del Ballard, Jr. won his first PBA title at the historic U.S. Open sponsored this season by Seagram's Coolers. The tourney offered a $500,000 prize fund and $100,000 first prize—both PBA records. Even Pete Weber's second place check of $55,000 in this event was higher than the previous record first prize of $50,000 set in 1986.

Randy Pedersen took the title in the Toledo Trust PBA National Championship. At the Firestone Tournament of Champions, winner Pete Weber became the youngest bowler ever to reach 10 career titles (24 years, 247 days).

While he didn't go on to win the tournament, Pete McCordic made history at the Greater Los Angeles Open by firing a 300 game in the opening match of the finals. It was the PBA's fourth-ever nationally televised perfect game, and the first since 1974.

Marshall Holman won the PBA Player of the Year vote despite not winning a title—a PBA first.  The 20-time titlist did lead the Tour in average and a few other statistical categories.

Tournament schedule

References

External links
1987 Season Schedule

Professional Bowlers Association seasons
1987 in bowling